The Kolvitsa is a river in the south of the Kola Peninsula in Murmansk Oblast, Russia. The Kolvitsa originates from Lake Kolvitskoye and flows into the Kolvitskaya Bay, Kandalaksha Gulf, White Sea near the village of Kolvitsa.

External links
 

Rivers of Murmansk Oblast
Kandalakshsky District